The Suhr House (Danish: Den Suhrske Gård) is a listed Neoclassical property located at Gammeltorv 22 in central Copenhagen, Denmark. The site has been owned by the Suhr family since 1749. The current buildings was built for Peter Bernt Suhr and are now owned by Den Suhrske Stiftelse, a family trust created by his son Theodor Suhr.

It is owned by the Den Suhrske Stiftelse, a foundation created by Theodor Suhr, its owner from 1815 to 1860.

History

Johan Peter Suhr took over his father-in-law's business at Gammeltorv in 1749. Under his leadership, it developed into a thriving trading house. His son Ole Bernt Suhr became a partner in the company in 1782.

Johan Peter Suhr died on 28 May 1785. Ten years later, on 5 July 1795, the Copenhagen Fire of 1795 destroyed the entire area around Gammeltorv. The current complex of buildings at the site was built for Ole Berendt Suhr in 1796–1797. The architect or builder is not known.

Ole Bernt Suhr's son, Theodor Suhr (1792–1858) took over the company as well as the property in Gammeltorv after his father in 1814. He mixed with the cultural and political elite. Johan Ludvig Heiberg and Johanne Luise Heiberg were frequent visitors in the house. Later, Suhr also acquired the country house Sølyst north of Copenhagen and the estate Bonderup at Holbæk.

Suhr lived in the house until 1856. Having no children, he passed it on to his nephew Ole Suhr. Ole Suhr lived in the complex from 1839 to 1847 and again from 1860 to 1875.

Architecture
The ground floor has rustication and the central projects is on the upper floors decorated with four Ionic order pilasters and is tipped by a reiangular pediment. The complex also comprises a side wing and a rear wing. All walls facing the courtyard stand in blank, red brick.

See also
 Listed buildings in Copenhagen Municipality

References

External links

 Det Sihrske Hus
 Den Suhrske Stiftelse
 Source
 Source

Listed residential buildings in Copenhagen
Neoclassical architecture in Copenhagen
Buildings and structures associated with the Suhr family
Buildings and structures completed in 1686